Rodophil is a rural unincorporated community in western Amelia County in the U.S. state of Virginia, located at the intersection of SR 616 (S. Genito Road) and the southern terminus of SR 620 (Rodophil Road). It straddles the border of ZIP codes 23002 (Amelia Court House, the county seat) and 23083 (Jetersville), and is served by the Paineville volunteer fire department.

The community was named for Rodophil Jeter (1765-1843), for whose family Jetersville was also named. Rodophil Jeter owned property in the area, and was a delegate to the state legislature in the early 1800s as well as a prominent figure in Amelia County government.

Variants (or possibly misspellings) of the name in older sources include "Rhodophil" and "Rodolphil". Rodophil had its own post office as early as 1835 and apparently as late as the turn of the 20th century. The structure may have been located on Route 620 at the entrance to Ingleside, just north of Route 616.

During the final days of the Civil War, in the phase known as the Appomattox campaign, contingents of both Union and Confederate soldiers passed through the vicinity, although no significant engagements are documented to have taken place at Rodophil. The last major battle fought by General Robert E. Lee's Army of Northern Virginia occurred a few miles southwest at Sayler's Creek, on the border of Amelia and Prince Edward counties, on April 6; Lee surrendered to Ulysses S. Grant at Appomattox on April 9, 1865.

Reed Rock School, built around 1923 or 1924, was among several Rosenwald Schools in Amelia County. The design called for a 2-acre campus with a building to accommodate one teacher. It is unclear exactly where the structure was located, but modern-day Reed Rock Road (SR 621) runs in a broad arc just northwest of Rodophil. During the early 20th century, the Rosenwald School project was a collaborative effort that constructed thousands of facilities across the South primarily for the education of African American children.

Ingleside, a house on Rodophil Road with connections to the Jeter family, was added to the National Register of Historic Places in 1997.

References

Unincorporated communities in Virginia
Unincorporated communities in Amelia County, Virginia